The 2007–08 Belgian Elite League pitted eight Belgian rugby teams. Competition began on 23 September 2007 and ended with the final game on 17 May 2008 at the King Baudouin Stadium. The Boitsfort Rugby Club won the championship by beating ASUB Waterloo in the final of the playoffs by the score of 27-7. This is the eighth consecutive title for Boitsfort and fifteenth in its history.

Season table

{| class="wikitable" width="450px" style="float:left; font-size:95%; margin-left:15px;"
| colspan="2"  style="text-align:center; background:#fff;" cellpadding="0" cellspacing="0"|Key to colours
|-
| style="background: #3fff00;" |     
| Champions
|-
| style="background:#ccf;"|     
|Participants in Championship Playoffs
|-
| style="background: #ff79B4;" |     
|Bottom team is relegated to Division 2.
|}

Championship playoffs

External links
 Belgian Rugby Federation

2007–08
2007–08  in European rugby union leagues